was a Japanese samurai warrior  during the  Sengoku period , and was one of the vassals of Oda Nobunaga .  He was the first samurai in the "Kuro-horo-shu" (bodyguard unit in black) elite troops selected from Nobunaga's aides, and later served as an assistant to Oda Nobutada, Nobunaga's eldest son. He was also  the lord of Mino Iwamura, and later became the lord of Kai province.   There are few documents related to Hidetaka and Kawajiri clan , and many of his traces are recorded in Shinchō Kōki, Koyo Gunkan, and records related to Tokugawa clan.

Biography

Service under Nobuhide
It is said that he was born in  Iwasaki Village, Owari Province.  Hidetaka served Oda Nobuhide from an early stage.  His real name Hidetaka's "Hide"(秀) is considered to be a bias from Nobuhide's Hide(秀)

In August 1542, he was only 16 years old and participated in the first Battle of Azukizaka as a vassal of  Nobuhide.  At this time, he was in a single combat with a commander of Ashigaru,  Yuhara(由原), who was the forerunner of the Imagawa clan, and gave a martial art of defeating him at the end of the group battle.

Service under Nobunaga 
After Nobuhide's death, he also served Oda Nobunaga and became the head of "Kuro-horo-shu" (bodyguard unit in black). In 1558, when Nobunaga summoned his younger brother Oda Nobuyuki  to Kiyosu Castle to murder him, he carried out assassination of Nobuyuki .

He participates in the Battle of Okehazama in May 1560. He followed Nobunaga, who suddenly  rushed out, with other only four vassals; Iwamuro Shigeyasu , Hasegawa Hashisuke , Yamaguchi Hidanokami, and Katō Yasaburo. It is said that Mōri Yoshikatsu defeated Imagawa Yoshimoto in the battle, but there is also a different theory that Hidetaka killed Yoshimoto.

In the summer 1565, he was ordered to attack Mino Sarubami Castle with Niwa Nagahide. The castle owner, Tajimi Shuri-no-Suke, used the advantage of the land to protect the castle well, but Nagahide occupied the neighboring mountain and cut off the water source, and Hidetaka launched an onslaught and dropped the castle. In the fierce battle, Battle of Dōhora castle, on September 28 of 1565, he got into the inner citadel  first, which let him win fame in the battle, and forced  the enemy commander, Kishi Nobuharu to kill himself. After the war, he was given Sarubami Castle by a series of achievements in the attack on Mino, and the castle name was changed to Katsuyama Castle.  After entering Katsuyama, the castle town of Sakahogi, Chozoji, was designated as Kawajiri's family temple. He also allegedly supported the reconstruction of Daisen-ji Temple, which was  burned down in the war.

In 1569, he was dispatched with Sakai Masahisa as a messenger telling Imai Sōkyū to hand over the testimony of Sakai Kitasho. In August of 1569, he participated in the subdue of  Kitabatake clan based in Okawachi Castle, Ise province. At this time, he was in charge of patrols the headquarters of Oda army inside the fence with  Sugaya Nagayori, Harada Naomasa, Nakagawa Shigemasa, Maeda Toshiie. The name can be seen in the draft letter of sympathy sent by Munehisa Imai to the Oda clan generals on September 6 of 1569.

On February 19, 1570, Imai Sokyu sent urgent news that Akagi Nobuyasu defeated  the army of Miyoshi clan in Awaji province. In the draft letter, the names are listed alongside Kanamori Nagachika, Takei Yūan, Sakai Kōsai, and Sugaya Naganori, and it can be seen that he was recognized as one of the Nobunaga's representative aides at that time. On March 6, 1570, Nakayama Takachika and Kanroji Tsunemoto visited Nobunaga, but Hidetaka responded due to his absence and received 30 swords as a thank-you. On June 28, 1570, he served in the Battle of Anegawa, and in the siege of Sawayama Castle, where Isono Kazumasa, a vassal of Azai Nagamasa, was holding,  after the main war, he set up on Nishi-Hikoneyama, one of the attached castles. At the Siege of Shiga in September of 1570, he entered the fort of Anota with Sakuma Nobumori, Akechi Mitsuhide, Murai Sadakatsu, Sassa Narimasa, and played a part in the Siege of Enryaku-ji Temple on Mt. Hiei.

In February 1571, he entered Sawayama Castle after Isono Kazumasa moved out, and since then he has been active as a castle general with Niwa Nagahide. In September of 1571, Nobunaga ordered that the Tendai Temple affiliated with Enryaku-ji at Mt. Hiei was burned down, Hidetaka and Nagahide burned down Saimyōji temple

In 1582, while planning the Conquest of Kōshū, Nobunaga assigned an army to his eldest son, Oda Nobutada, and had him invade Shinano and Kai Province, Hidetaka along with Takigawa Kazumasu became a military commander.

Death
Several months later after Battle of Tenmokuzan, Kawajiri Hidetaka died on June 18, 1582.

References 
 
 
 
 
 /所収:

References

External links

Samurai
Daimyo
1527 births
1582 deaths
Oda retainers
People from Aichi Prefecture